The 1st Uhlans Regiment of Polish Legions was a cavalry unit of the Polish Legions during World War I. Members of the unit were named "Beliniaki", after their original leader Władysław Zygmunt Belina-Prażmowski.

The regiment was created on August 13, 1914 from a squadron composed of 140 soldiers formed by Belina-Prażmowski. The unit was based on The Seven Lancers of Belina, the vanguard of the march of the First Cadre Company on August 6, 1914. The cavalry unit  was composed of Janusz Głuchowski "Janusz", Antoni Jabłoński "Zdzisław", Zygmunt Karol Karwacki "Stanisław Bończa", Stefan Kulesza "Hanka", Stanisław Skotnicki "Grzmot", and   "Kmicic" under Prażmowski's command.

In February and March 1917, the regiment organized and implemented officer training (for officers and non-commissioned officers) and administrative courses.

On August 10, 1917, the leader of the Polish Legions handed over the command of the regiment to captain Albert Kordecki of the 2nd Cavalry Regiment.

Beliniaks 

 Command

 cavalry major Juliusz Ostoja-Zagórski

The commanding staff in 1917 r.

 commander of the regiment– major Władysław Belina-Prażmowski
 squadron commander – cpt. Janusz Głuchowski (since 1 Jan 1915)
 squadron commander –  porucznik Jerzy Pytlewski (since 1 June 1915)

 COs

 Konstanty Abłamowicz
 Stanisław Bietkowski
 Tadeusz Bietkowski
 Wacław Budzyński
 Bolesław Wieniawa-Długoszowski
 Stanisław Korczak
 Tadeusz Korniłowicz
 Włodzimierz Nieprzewski
 Zygmunt Piasecki
 Zygmunt Młot-Przepałkowski
 Kazimierz Stamirowski
 Leon Strzelecki
 Mariusz Zaruski
 Wacław Calewski
 Eugeniusz Chrościcki
 Wojciech Bucior
 Tadeusz Ścibor-Rylski
 Tadeusz Faliszewski
 Ksawery Święcicki
 Janusz Żuławski
 regiment medic Ksawery Maszadr

 NCOs and Ułans

 Marian Józef Czerkawski
 corp. Stanisław Gąssowski
 Franciszek Koziej
 sr. ułan Jan Władysław Lemański
 wachtmeister Emil Franciszek Mecnarowski
 Jan Maria Romański
 plutonowy Leon Trojanowski

Legacy 
From this regiment, three further were formed, namely:

 1 Pułk Szwoleżerów Józefa Piłsudskiego.
 7 Pułk Ułanów Lubelskich im. gen. Kazimierza Sosnkowskiego.
 11 Pułk Ułanów Legionowych im. marszałka Edwarda Śmigłego-Rydza.

Medal 
The medal, designed by corporal Kajetan Stanowicz, was instated on 5 November 1916. It has a round shield of a 41 to 45mm diameter with a twisted-rope-like edge. On it is engraved the monogram "1PU" on the background of an Uhlan hat and two dates: "II VII 1914" the date on which Belina's patrol left Galicia for the kingdom; and "V XI 1916" the day the medal was instituted. The medal was approved by the Minister of Military Affairs on 5 May 1920. Bearing it required being part of the regiment for at least a year. All in all 800 medals were issued.

References

Bibliography 
 „Księga jazdy polskiej”: pod protektoratem marsz. Edwarda Śmigłego–Rydza. Warszawa 1936. Reprint: Wydawnictwo Bellona Warszawa 1993

Polish Legions in World War I